Found a Cure may refer to:

 "Found a Cure" (Ashford & Simpson song), 1979
 "Found a Cure" (Ultra Naté song), 1998